The king snake eel (Ophichthus rex) is an eel in the family Ophichthidae (worm/snake eels). It was described by James Erwin Böhlke and John H. Caruso in 1980. It is a marine, tropical eel which is known from Florida to Texas, USA, in the northern Gulf of Mexico in the western Atlantic Ocean.

The King snake eel is often caught near oil platforms by anglers.

References

Fish described in 1980
Ophichthus
Taxa named by James Erwin Böhlke
Taxa named by John H. Caruso